The 1993 All-Big Ten Conference football team consists of American football players chosen as All-Big Ten Conference players for the 1993 NCAA Division I-A football season.

Offensive selections

Quarterbacks
 Elvis Grbac, Michigan (AP-1)

Running backs
 Tyrone Wheatley, Michigan (AP-1) (Offensive Player of the Year)
 Tico Duckett, Michigan State (AP-1)

Receivers
 Derrick Alexander, Michigan (AP-1)
 Lee Gissendaner, Northwestern (AP-1)

Tight ends
 Alan Cross, Iowa (AP-1)

Centers
 Steve Everitt, Michigan (AP-1)

Guards
 Chuck Belin, Wisconsin (AP-1)
 Joe Cocozzo, Michigan (AP-1)

Tackles
 Rob Doherty, Michigan (AP-1)
 Brad Hopkins, Illinois (AP-1)

Defensive selections

Defensive linemen
 Chris Hutchinson, Michigan (AP-1)
 Lamark Shackerford, Wisconsin (AP-1)
 Greg Smith, Ohio State (AP-1)
 Mike Wells, Iowa (AP-1)
 Jeff Zgonina, Purdue (AP-1) (Defensive Player of the Year)

Linebackers
 Eric Beatty, Purdue (AP-1)
 Gary Casper, Wisconsin (AP-1)
 Steve Tovar, Ohio State (AP-1)

Defensive backs
 Corwin Brown, Michigan (AP-1)
 Roger Harper, Ohio State (AP-1)
 Carlos James, Iowa (AP-1)

Special teams

Kickers
 Rich Thompson, Wisconsin (AP-1)

Punters
 Jim DiGuilio, Indiana (AP-1)

Key
AP = Associated Press, selected by a Midwest media panel

See also
1993 College Football All-America Team

References

All-Big Ten Conference
All-Big Ten Conference football teams